John I (c. 1217/12188 October 1286), known as John the Red due to the colour of his beard, was Duke of Brittany from 1221 to his death and 2nd Earl of Richmond in 1268.

John was the eldest of three children born to Duchess Alix and her husband and jure uxoris co-ruler, Duke Peter I. He became duke upon his mother's death in 1221. His father, who had reigned as duke due to his marriage to Alix, ruled as regent until John reached adulthood. In 1268, Henry III granted the earldom of Richmond to John, and the title continued in his family, through frequent temporary forfeitures and reversions, until 1342.

He experienced a number of conflicts with the Bishop of Nantes and the Breton clergy. In 1240, he issued an edict expelling Jews from the duchy and cancelling all debts to them. He joined Louis IX of France in the Eighth Crusade in 1270, and survived the plague that killed the king. The duchy of Brittany experienced a century of peace, beginning with John I and ending with Duke John III's reign in 1341.

Marriage and issue
In 1236 John married Infanta Blanche, daughter of King Theobald I of Navarre. They had the following surviving issue:

John II, Duke of Brittany (1239–1305), married Beatrice of England and had issue.
Peter (1241–1268), Lord of Dinan, Hade, Léon, Hennebont and La Roche-Derrien.
Alix (1243–1288), Dame de Pontarcy; married John of Châtillon, Count of Blois.
Theobald (1245–1246), interred in the church abbey of Saint-Gildas-de-Rhuys.
Theobald (1247died young), interred in the church abbey of Saint-Gildas-de-Rhuys.
Eleanor (1248died young), interred in the church abbey of Saint-Gildas-de-Rhuys.
Nicolas (1249–1251), interred in the church abbey of Saint-Gildas-de-Rhuys.
Robert (1251–1259), interred in the church abbey of Saint-Gildas-de-Rhuys.

References

Sources

See also

Dukes of Brittany family tree

1210s births
1286 deaths
13th-century dukes of Brittany
13th-century English nobility
Dukes of Brittany
Earls of Richmond (1268 creation)
Medieval child monarchs
House of Dreux
Christians of the Eighth Crusade